Neodymium nitride or neodymium(III) nitride is a chemical compound of neodymium and nitrogen with the formula NdN in which neodymium exhibits the +3 oxidation state and nitrogen exhibits the -3 oxidation state. It is ferromagnetic, like gadolinium(III) nitride, terbium(III) nitride and dysprosium(III) nitride. Neodymium nitride is not usually stoichiometric, and it is very hard to create pure stoichiometric neodymium nitride.

Preparation
Neodymium nitride can be prepared via an exothermic metathesis reaction between lithium nitride and anhydrous neodymium(III) chloride. Lithium chloride formed in the reaction can be removed by THF, a chemical in which lithium chloride dissolves in.
 NdCl3 + Li3N → NdN + 3 LiCl

It can also be prepared directly when neodymium reacts directly with nitrogen:
 2 Nd + N2 → 2 NdN

It can be prepared when decomposing neodymium amide:
 Nd(NH2)3 → NdN + N2 + 3H2

It can also be produced when neodymium is ignited in air (which contains nitrogen), but this also produces other compounds, such as neodymium oxide.

See also
 Neodymium
 Nitrogen
 Lanthanide

References 

Nitrides
Neodymium compounds